Bernard Arps, Professor of Indonesian and Javanese Language and Culture at Leiden University, Netherlands, was born in 1961 in Leiden.

Biography
Arps teaches in the Department of Languages and Cultures of Indonesia at Leiden University. He also chaired this department in the years 1995, 1999–2000, and 2003–2006. Earlier, he was a lecturer in Indonesian and Javanese at the School of Oriental and African Studies, University of London from 1988 to 1993. He also served as Fellow-in-Residence at the Netherlands Institute for Advanced Study in the Humanities and Social Sciences in 2001–02, a visiting fellow in the Faculty of Asian Studies and the Humanities Research Centre at the Australian National University during the first half of 2005, and the Netherlands Visiting Professor of Asian Languages and Cultures at the University of Michigan in 2006–07.

Arps wrote his thesis in 1992, entitled Tembang in Two Traditions. Performance and Interpretation of Javanese Literature.

Arps, in association with Annabel Teh Gallop, produced a bilingual photographic catalogue of Indonesian manuscripts, "Golden letters: writing traditions of Indonesia" ("Surat Emas: Budaya Tulis di Indonesia" in Indonesian).

Since 1979 Arps spent four years on fieldwork in Indonesia, in the regions of Surakarta and Yogyakarta in central Java, Banyuwangi on the eastern tip of the island, and Cilacap on the south coast. He has also edited works on performance and texts, and articles on Javanese and Indonesian dramatic, literary, religious, scholarly, and media discourse.

Publications

References

Living people
Academics of SOAS University of London
1961 births
University of Michigan faculty
Academic staff of Leiden University
People from Leiden